{{Infobox person
| name         = Colin Fox
| image        = 
| image_size   = 250px
| caption      = Colin Fox (right)  playing Swiss chef Fritz Brenner in the A&E TV original series, A Nero Wolfe Mystery
| birth_name   = 
| birth_date   = 
| birth_place  = Aldershot, Ontario, Canada
| othername    = Colin R. Fox
| education    = National Theatre School of Canada
| occupation   = Actor
| years_active = 1963–present
| spouse       = 
| children = 1
| homepage     =
}}

Colin Fox (born November 20, 1938) is a Canadian character actor.

Career

His acting credits include playing Jean Paul Desmond and Jacques Eloi Des Mondes (the latter speaking to his descendant from the portrait) in Strange Paradise (CBC/Syndicated, 1969–70), as well as voice work in various animated series, and in other roles in film, television and on the stage. He created the role of Walter Telford, an attorney on the series High Hopes. His most famous role may be that of Anton Hendricks in the TV series PSI Factor: Chronicles of the Paranormal. He also appeared in Shining Time Station episode, "Schemer's Special Club" as the misogynistic and racist Nicklear Club President and owner Mr. Hobart Hume III.

Fox is well known for his portrayal of Swiss chef Fritz Brenner in the A&E TV original series, A Nero Wolfe Mystery (2001–2002), and the series pilot, The Golden Spiders: A Nero Wolfe Mystery (2000). Fox's Fritz is a complex person, like the Fritz portrayed in the books, but does not joke with Archie as much. A running joke in the series is the offscreen sound of pots and pans falling and dishes breaking when Fritz is annoyed or upset. In "Eeny Meeny Murder Mo", Fritz gets drunk after a woman is murdered in Wolfe's office and Wolfe refuses to eat.

Fox played cunning, ruthless villains in three episodes of the Canadian TV show Friday the 13th: The Series.  The first was monk Rupert LeCroix in "The Poisoned Pen" wielding a cursed quill pen that caused whatever was written by it to actually happen. The second was Sylvan Winters, taxidermist and Satanic Cult leader – who actually killed lead character, Micki Foster (Louise Robey) with the deadly Coin of Zaecles in the episode, "Tails I Live, Heads You Die." The third was German scientist Horst Mueller in "The Butcher," who used a silver amulet – a swastika enclosed in a circle – to resurrect a Nazi war criminal, Colonel Rausch a.k.a. The Butcher.

He also supplied the voice of the Professor in Rupert and the arch villain The Wizard in The Care Bears Adventure in Wonderland''.

Personal life
Fox was born in Aldershot, Ontario, Canada. He is a 1965 graduate of the National Theatre School of Canada. Fox's wife, Carol, is deceased. They had one daughter, Sarah. He lives in Elora, Ontario, just outside Toronto, in an 1860s Victorian home.

Filmography

References

External links
 

1938 births
Living people
Male actors from Ontario
Canadian male film actors
Canadian male stage actors
Canadian male television actors
Canadian male voice actors
People from Centre Wellington
National Theatre School of Canada alumni
Canadian Screen Award winners